Emmanuel Fernandes (born 10 August 1980) is a French politician of La France Insoumise (NUPES) who has been representing Bas-Rhin's 2nd constituency in the National Assembly since 2022.

Early life 
Fernandes was born to a Portuguese father and French mother.

See also 

 List of deputies of the 16th National Assembly of France

References 

Living people
1980 births
Deputies of the 16th National Assembly of the French Fifth Republic
21st-century French politicians
La France Insoumise politicians
Members of Parliament for Bas-Rhin
French people of Portuguese descent